{{Infobox Boxingmatch
| Fight Name    = A Battle for the Ages. A Fight for Supremacy 
| fight date    = February 28, 2009
| image         =  
| location      = Toyota Center, Houston, Texas, U.S.
| titles        = The Ring and vacant WBA (Super) and WBO lightweight titles
| fighter1      = Juan Manuel Márquez 
| nickname1     = Dinamita("Dynamite")
| record1       = 49–4–1 (36 KO)
| hometown1     = Mexico City, Mexico
| height1       = 5 feet 7 inches
|weight1 = 134+1/2 lbs
|style1 = Orthodox
| recognition1  = The Ring lightweight champion[[The Ring (magazine)|The Ring]] No. 2 ranked pound-for-pound fighter3-division world champion
| fighter2      = Juan Díaz
| nickname2     = Baby Bull
| record2       = 34–1 (17 KO)
| hometown2     = Houston, Texas, U.S.
| height2       = 5 feet 6 inches
|weight2 = 134+1/2 lb
|style2 = Orthodox
| recognition2  = IBO lightweight champion
| result        =  Márquez wins via 9th-round TKO
}}

Juan Manuel Márquez vs. Juan Díaz, billed as A Battle for the Ages. A Fight for Supremacy, was a boxing lightweight title superfight, for the vacant WBO and WBA lightweight championship, and Marquez's The Ring'' lightweight title. The bout was held on February 28, 2009, at the Toyota Center in Houston, Texas, United States. Marquez won the fight via technical knockout in the ninth round.

The match was named the 2009 Fight of the Year.

The fight
Díaz controlled the fight early in the bout as the two boxers exchanged punches. Díaz opened a cut above Márquez's right eye in the fifth round, and looked to control the bout, but Márquez responded by opening a gash above Diaz's right eye, and stunning him with a left hook before the end of the eighth round. Márquez landed two hard rights to Díaz's face in a three-punch combination that knocked Díaz down with 35 seconds remaining in the ninth round. Díaz rose, but seconds later, Márquez followed with a right uppercut to the chin that knocked Díaz down for a second time. Referee Rafael Ramos waved an end to the fight after two minutes and 40 seconds of the ninth round.

Aftermath
With the victory, Márquez defended his Ring Lightweight title, and claimed the WBO, the WBA, and the IBO Lightweight championship titles.

References

Boxing matches
2009 in boxing
Boxing in Houston
2009 in sports in Texas
Boxing on HBO
Golden Boy Promotions
February 2009 sports events in the United States